Senapati (Meitei pronunciation:/se.na.pə.ti/) is the district headquarters of Senapati district in the state of Manipur in India.

Notes

References 

Cities and towns in Senapati district